Val Camonica (also Valcamonica or Camonica Valley, Eastern Lombard: Al Camònega) is one of the largest valleys of the central Alps, in eastern Lombardy, Italy.

The River Oglio runs through its full length, rising at Ponte di Legno and flowing into Lake Iseo between Pisogne and Costa Volpino.

Almost all of the valley is included in the administrative territory of the province of Brescia, except for Lovere, Rogno, Costa Volpino and the Val di Scalve, which belong to the province of Bergamo.

Since 1979, the rock drawings located along the valley are a UNESCO World Heritage Site, while the entire valley became a UNESCO World Biosphere Reserve in 2018.

Etymology
Val Camonica is derived from the Latin Vallis Camunnorum, "Valley of the Camunni."

Geography

Territory
Val Camonica can be divided into three main areas: 
 Lower Val Camonica: a flat area of meadows and fields, starting from the shores of Lake Iseo and extending to the transverse ridge of Bienno, sometimes referred to as the Breno Threshold.
 Middle Val Camonica: extending from the Breno Threshold to the municipality of Sonico  Edolo. The lower middle valley extends from Breno to Sellero, while the upper middle valley starts at the narrow gorge at Cedegolo and extends to Sonico  Edolo.
 High Val Camonica: This part of the valley follows the Periadriatic Seam, and is  oriented from east to west. Starting in the Val di Corteno, it continues as to the town of Ponte di Legno at the top of the valley. Its climate is similar to that of central Valtellina.

The valley is bounded by these borders:

Hydrography
Val Camonica is traversed by the River Oglio, the fifth longest river in Italy, which rises at Ponte di Legno from the confluence of the Frigidolfo and Narcanello rivers. It flows into Lake Iseo between the municipalities of Pisogne and Costa Volpino.

Numerous streams, some of them seasonal, descend from the mountainsides and flow into the Oglio.

At high altitude there are many alpine lakes, including Lago Moro, as well as many artificial reservoirs, such as the Lago d'Arno.

History
Val Camonica likely became habitable only around 15,000 years ago, at the end of last ice age, with the melting of the glacier that first carved out the valley. It is likely that the first humans visited the valley in epipaleolithic times, and appear to have settled by the Neolithic period. When the Ancient Romans extended their dominions north of the River Po, they encountered a people called the Camunni, who were a Rhaetian tribe, populating the valley. About 300,000 petroglyphs survive from this period. By the end of the first century BC, the Valle Camonica was ruled by Ancient Rome, which established the city of Cividate Camuno, with baths, an amphitheater and a large temple dedicated to Minerva.

During the Middle Ages, numerous clashes between the Guelphs and Ghibellines took place in this region. The Guelphs supported the power of the Bishop of Brescia and the papacy, while the Ghibellines sided with the Holy Roman Emperor. In 1287 the Val Camonica rebelled against control by Brescia and sided with the Visconti, lords of Milan, who extended their control over the area during the 14th century. From 1427 to 1454 there were numerous battles between the Duchy of Milan and the Republic of Venice for the control of the valley. Ultimately the valley came under the control of Venice. During the following centuries, the civilian population grew and engaged in the iron trade.

Val Camonica was separated from Venice after Venice was conquered by Napoleon in 1797. After the deposition of Napoleon, the area was controlled by the Austro-Hungarian Empire. In 1859, Val Camonica was annexed to the Kingdom of Italy. During World War I battle lines stretched along its eastern border, across the Adamello Group. The battles fought in this area are known as the White War in the Adamello.

In 1955, the National Park of Naquane stone carvings at Capo di Ponte was created by the Archaeological Administration of Lombardy.

Monuments and places of interest

UNESCO Site

Val Camonica is home to the greatest complex of rock drawings in Europe, containing approximately 300,000 petroglyphs from the epipaleolithic era to the middle ages.
 Parco nazionale delle incisioni rupestri di Naquane in Capo di Ponte
 Parco archeologico nazionale dei massi di Cemmo
 Parco archeologico comunale di Seradina-Bedolina in Capo di Ponte
 Parco archeologico di Asinino-Anvòia in Ossimo
 Parco archeologico comunale di Luine in Darfo Boario Terme
 Parco archeologico comunale di Sellero
 Parco archeologico comunale di Sonico
 Riserva naturale Incisioni rupestri di Ceto, Cimbergo e Paspardo in Nadro

Camonica was the first site in Italy included in UNESCO’s World Heritage list in 1979 because of its unique symbols and more than 140,000 figures carved along 8,000 years on rocks.

Medieval villages
 Bienno, recognised as one of the Most Beautiful Villages of Italy
 Lovere, also recognised as one of the Most Beautiful Villages of Italy
 Pescarzo (Capo di Ponte), a characteristic small town.

Castles
 Castle of Breno, the largest castle in Val Camonica
 Castle of Gorzone, home of the Federici family, standing on a small hill next to the Dezzo torrent
 Castle of Cimbergo, in the valley of the Re, dominates the middle Valley
 Castle of Lozio, the fortress where the Lozio Massacre occurred
 Castle of Mù, the Federici bastion in the upper valley, of which only the foundations remain

Roman city
 Theatre and Amphitheater at Cividate Camuno
 Temple of Minerva at Breno

Mountain excursions
 CAI paths in the Parco dell'Adamello
 First World War (so-called "Guerra Bianca in Adamello") trench at Vezza d'Oglio

Roman Baths
 Boario Terme
 Angolo Terme

Museums and theme parks
 Parco tematico Archeopark, Darfo Boario Terme
 Museo etnografico del ferro, delle arti e tradizioni popolari, Bienno
 Museo Civico Camuno, Breno
 Museo didattico di arte e vita preistorica, Capo di Ponte
 Museo didattico della riserva, Nadro
 Museo archeologico di Valle Camonica, Cividate Camuno
 Mostra museo Camillo Golgi, Corteno Golgi
 Museo etnografico, Ossimo
 Museo parrocchiale d'arte sacra, Ponte di Legno
 Museo della Guerra Bianca in Adamello, Temù

Notable sanctuaries and churches
 Chiesa di Santa Maria della Neve in Pisogne
 Chiesa di Sant'Antonio in Breno
 Chiesa di Santa Maria Annunziata in Bienno
 Santuario del Cristo Re in Bienno
 Chiesa di Santa Maria Assunta in Esine
 Monastero di San Salvatore in Capo di Ponte
 Oratorio dei Disciplini in Montecchio
 Pieve di San Siro in Cemmo
 Santuario della Via Crucis in Cerveno (Sacri Monti)

Winter sports
 Winter sports Centers at Ponte di Legno, Borno, Montecampione, Aprica and Val Palot

Photo gallery

See also
 Camunni
 Rock Drawings in Valcamonica
 Val Camonica witch trials

Notes

References

External links

 Itinera in Valcamonica (EN)
 Italian World Heritage Sites
 National museum and archaeological park with Roman theatre and amphitheatre
 Valcamonica Rock Art, records and pictures
 EuroPreArt, European Prehistoric Art database, 50 Valcamonica rock art records

Archaeological sites in Italy
Province of Bergamo
Province of Brescia
Valleys of the Alps
Camonica
World Heritage Sites in Italy
Biosphere reserves of Italy